David Sudarsky is an astrophysicist at the University of Arizona.  He is primarily known for producing the first exoplanet classification system, which is based on a series of theoretical gas-giant-atmosphere models. By modeling the physical characteristics and chemistry of their atmospheres, the appearance of gas giants is predicted.

He has published numerous papers listed in arXiv.

References

Year of birth missing (living people)
Living people
American astronomers
Planetary scientists
University of Arizona faculty